Houping Miao and Tuzi Ethnic Township (后坪苗族土家族乡) is an ethnic township in Wulong County of the Chongqing Municipality of China The area is noted for its landscape and geological features known as the Wulong Karst and the Er Wang Dong cave.

Houping obtained its ethnic township designation in 2009; previously, it was simply Houping Township.

References

Township-level divisions of Chongqing